Mauron is a commune in the Morbihan department and Brittany region of north-western France. It lies close to the borders of both Côtes d'Armor and Ille-et-Vilaine. Mauron's location make it a crossroads on the routes connecting Dinan to Vannes and Quimper to Rennes.

History
Aerial archaeology has revealed the existence of a large number of Gaulish farms, attesting to the agricultural wealth of the territory, which is traversed by the Roman road leading from Quimper to Rennes.

Saint Judicaël founded a monastery in the area, at a place called Saint-Léry.

The first historical mention of Mauron dates from 1152. In the eighteenth century, a fair was held here on 28 October each year, the feast of St Simon.

Battle of Mauron

On 14 August 1352 six hundred French Bretons (who supported King John II of France, the protector of Charles of Blois) under the leadership of the marshal of Offemont fought Anglo-Breton troops (supporting the Montfort side) which was led by Gaultier de Genteley (or Venteley, or Benteley). He was assisted by Tanguy du Chastel, Yves Trésiguidy and Garnier de Cadoual. The battle appears to have taken place near the village of Bois-de-la-Roche.

The king's troops lost the battle, and many corpses were left on the field of battle, including those of the marshal of Offemont, the count of Marche, the lords of Bricquebec and Beauvais, Alain VII (11th viscount Rohan), Tinténiac, and a significant number of knights (around 140).

Demographics
In 2017 the commune had 3,082 inhabitants. In French the inhabitants of Mauron are known as Mauronnais.

Breton language
In September 2019, 25 of the commune's 179 public primary school pupils were being educated bilingually.

Sites and Monuments

Religious
 The Church of St Peter.
 The Monastery of l'Action de Grâces, founded by Virginie Danion, a native of Mauron, in 1869. A painting by Alphonse Le Hénaff can be seen in the chapel.
 The 17th-century Chapel of St Anne in the village of Beuve, near the site of a château which was destroyed in 1676.

Civil
 Château de Boyer
 Château du Ferron
 Château de La Ville-Davy
 Starting-point of the "Voie verte Mauron Questembert" (a footpath running from Mauron to Questembert): an idea formulated by the General Council of Morbihan and opened in 2002. It uses the ancient route of the railway line from La Brohinière to Ploërmel and then the Ploërmel to Questembert line.

Personalities connected to the commune
 The playwright Romain Weingarten (1926-2006) is buried in Mauron, to which he had retired in later life.
 Virginie Danion, founder of the monastery of l'Action de Grâces and sister-in-law of the architect Sigismond Ropartz,

Twin towns
Mauron is twinned with the town of Newmarket in Ireland.

See also
Communes of the Morbihan department

References

External links

 Official site 
 
 Patrimonial Encyclopaedia of the Community of Communes of Mauron in Brocéliande 
 Mayors of Morbihan Association 

Communes of Morbihan